Queen Wondeok of the Yu clan (Hangul: 원덕왕후 유씨, Hanja: 元德王后 柳氏; d. 1239) was a Goryeo royal family member as the descendant of King Munjong who became a queen consort through her marriage with her fourth cousin once removed, King Gangjong as his second wife, which she then changed her initial clan and became the mother of his only successor, King Gojong. Gangjong was her close relative in maternal line, but very distant in paternal line.

At one time, she was the second-in-command in the inner list of the main palace, but was dethroned and came back as a queen consort and queen mother (first-in-command). Due to the war, her husband got exiled and they hid in Ganghwa Island. During her lifetime, she already lived a dynamic life in many ways.

Biography
Her father-in-law, King Myeongjong was her mother's brother. So, both she and her husband were initially (maternal) first cousin and related by blood to King Sukjong and Queen Myeongui's blood.

Marriage
She married Crown Prince Wang O in 1175, a year after his first wife's removal and became his second wife. On 1192, after 17 years married, they had a son, Wang Jin (the future Gojong, King Anhyo the Great).

However, in 1197, her father-in-law, King Myeongjong was deposed and imprisoned in Changrak Palace by Choe Chung-heon and Choe Chung-su. As a result, her husband was also dethroned and got exiled to Ganghwa Island. Myeongjong's throne was given to his youngest brother, the 53-years-old Wang Tak and after his death, it was succeeded by his own son, Wang Yeong. Their life in Ganghwa were presumed to have been a life without any hope and must suffered a lot.

Life as Queen consort
In 1212, she formally became Queen Consort and given royal title of Princess Yeondeok (연덕궁주, 延德宮主) following the 60-years-old her husband's succession to the throne after Huijong failed to attacked and was defeated by that two Choe brothers. It was already 14 years since they got exile to Ganghwa. She now came back to Manwoldae again. Although not her own daughter, but it seems that the Queen had raise her husband's first wife's daughter well and took good care on her as well as on her own son. When the Princess get married, Suryeong dedicated a tribute to Gangjong and her to thanked her for take care of her along this time. The Queen was said to have virtuous qualities and beautiful figure. One year later, her husband fell ill and died while left her alone in the palace.

Life as Queen mother
He was succeeded by their only son, to which she later became a queen mother (태후, 太后). Although the date she formally became a queen mother was unknown, but in 1215, both she and King Gojong stayed in Western Cheongju Palace (청주동궁, 淸州洞宮) for a while. From this time, she was called as Grand Queen Mother (왕태후, 王太后) but in 1216, her mother died. In order to mourn his maternal grandmother, Gojong was said to wore a So-bok (소복) for three days after her death.

In 1218, her son married one of his relative and one year later, their eldest son and child, Wang Jeon was born. In 1220, her brother, Marquess Yeongin died. In 1232, she left Sangdo (상도, 上都) and moved to Gangdo (강도, 江都) while her daughter-in-law died in the same year. Three years later, Wang Jeon married and in 1236, his eldest son, Wang Sim was born.

Later life and death
Meanwhile, the queen mother was later died on her 72/3 years old in 1239 after life alone for more than 20 years, which she became the most longest-living Goryeo queen. She then buried in Golleung Tomb (곤릉, 坤陵) which nowadays became the "Historic Site No. 371". Also received her Posthumous name of Jeonggang (정강, 靖康) under Gojong's command in 1253.

Ancestors

In popular culture
 Portrayed by Jo Yang-ja in the 2003–2004 KBS TV series Age of Warriors.

References

External links
Queen Wondeok on Encykorea .
원덕태후 on Doosan Encyclopedia .

Royal consorts of the Goryeo Dynasty
Korean queens consort
Year of birth unknown
1239 deaths
13th-century Korean women